Studio with Gloves is a 1993 oil on canvas painting by the Welsh artist Shani Rhys James in the National Library of Wales.

This painting shows a self-portrait sitting among an array of discarded white work gloves in her studio. The artist is noted for her melancholy self-portraits. This painting however seems to catch the artist off-guard rather than in a melancholy mood, as it exposes the creative process in all of its riotous colors. The year after painting this self-portrait, Rhys James was elected to the Royal Cambrian Academy of Art in 1994.

References

artwork record on Europeana website

1993 paintings
Paintings in the National Library of Wales
Paintings about painting